Batesville is an unincorporated community in Barbour County, Alabama, United States.

History
Batesville was named after the plantation of William Michael Bates, who moved to the area from South Carolina in 1845. A post office operated under the name Batesville from 1854 to 1942.

Fort Browder, a small wooden fort, was built near Batesville to use as protection during the Creek War of 1836. Company D of the 15th Regiment Alabama Infantry was organized here and known as the "Fort Browder Roughs."

References

Unincorporated communities in Alabama
Unincorporated communities in Barbour County, Alabama